Gudalur is a municipality and taluk in Nilgiris district in the Indian state of Tamil Nadu.

Demographics

Religions

Languages

According to 2011 census, Gudalur had a population of 49,535 with a sex-ratio of 1,032 females for every 1,000 males, much above the national average of 929. A total of 5,359 were under the age of six, constituting 2,719 males and 2,640 females. Scheduled Castes and Scheduled Tribes accounted for 27.66% and 3.65% of the population respectively. The literacy rate of the town was 79.48%, compared to the national average of 72.99%. The town had a total of 12101 households. There were a total of 18,807 workers, comprising 551 cultivators, 1,759 main agricultural labourers, 206 household industries, 14,488 other workers, 1,803 marginal workers, 90 marginal cultivators, 278 marginal agricultural labourers, 119 marginal workers in household industries and 1,316 other marginal workers. As per the religious census of 2011, Gudalur had 59.83% Hindus, 26.01% Muslims, 14.1% Christians, 0.01% Sikhs, 0.05% following other religions and 0.01% following no religion or did not indicate any religious preference.

Climate

The normal rainfall is 3000 mm per annum. While 75% of the rain is received during the southwest monsoon, (June to August) and northeast monsoon (October to November) contribution of northeast monsoon is only 15% to the total of rainfall and 8% of the rains are received during the hot weather and 2% during the winter. The weather is mainly dry during January–March and the moisture content gradually increases thereon under the influence of southwest monsoon.

Politics
M. Pon Jeyaseelan is the Member of Legislative Assembly from Gudalur constituency.

Gudalur assembly constituency is one of the three constituencies in the Nilgiris district and the Gudalur assembly constituency a is part of Nilgiris (Lok Sabha constituency).

History

Pre-history
Historians believe that the human settlements existed in these parts for at least ten centuries before Christ. Much evidence of New Stone Age civilisation can be seen in the hills throughout the present day Wayanad district. The Edakkal Caves has 6000-year-old rock engravings from the Neolithic age. The recorded history of this district is available only from the 18th century. In ancient times, this land was ruled by the Rajas of the Veda tribe.

Ezhimala kingdom

In the earliest part of the recorded history of Gudalur region, Wayanad District, Kasaragod-Kannur-Wayanad-Kozhikode Districts in the northern part of present-day Kerala were ruled by the Nannans (Mushika dynasty) who later came to be known as the Kolathiris. Politically the area was part of the Ezhimala Kingdom with its Capital at Ezhimala in present day Kannur district. The most famous King of Ezhimala was Nannan whose Kingdom extended up to Gudalur, Nilgiris and northern parts of Coimbatore. It is said that Nannan took refuge at Wayanad hills in the 5th century CE when he was lost to Cheras, just before his execution in a battle, according to the Sangam works. Wayanad was a part of the Karkanad which included the eastern regions of Ezhimala kingdom (Wayanad-Gudalur areas including part of Kodagu (Coorg)). Karkanad along with Poozhinadu, which contained much of the coastal belt wedged between Mangalore and Kozhikode was under Ezhimala kingdom with the headquarters at Ezhimala.

Kolathunadu

The Mooshaka Kings were considered descendants of Nannan. By the 14th century, Mooshaka Kingdom was known as Kolathirinad and the Rulers as Kolathiris. The Kolathunad Kingdom at the peak of its power reportedly extended from 
Kasaragod in the north to Korapuzha in the south with Arabian Sea on the 
west and Kodagu hills on the eastern boundary.

Kingdom of Kottayam
The  Kolathiri  Dominion  emerged  into  independent 10 principalities i.e., Kadathanadu (Vadakara), Randathara or Poyanad (Dharmadom), Kottayam (Thalassery), Nileshwaram, Iruvazhinadu (Panoor), Kurumbranad etc., under separate royal chieftains due to the outcome of internal dissensions. The Nileshwaram dynasty on the northernmost part of Kolathiri dominion, were relatives to both Kolathunadu as well as Zamorin of Calicut, in the early medieval period. The  origin  of  Kottayam Royal Family (the Kottayam referred here is Kottayam-Malabar near Thalassery, not to be confused with Kottayam in Southern Kerala) is  lost  in  obscurity. It  has been stated that the Raja of Kottayam setup a semi-independent principality of his  own  at  the expense of  Kolathiris.  In  the  10th  century  AD,  the  region comprised erstwhile Taluks of Kottayam, Wayanad and Gudallur was called Puraikizhanad and  its feudal lord Puraikizhars.  The Thirunelly  Inscriptions refer  to  the  division  of  Puraikizhar  Family  into  two  branches  viz.,  Elder (Muthukur)  and  Younger  (Elamkur)  in  the  beginning  of  the  11th  century.  In 17th  century  Kottayam-Malabar  was  the  Capital  of  Puraikizhanad  (Puranattukara) Rajas. It was divided into three branches i.e., Eastern, Western and Southern under separate dignitaries known as Mootha, Elaya and Munnarkur Rajas. The Kottayam Rajas extended their influence up to the border of Kodagu. By the end of the  17th  century,  they  shared  the  area  of  Thalassery  Taluk  with  the Iruvazhinadu Nambiars and were in possession of North Wayanad and the small Village  of  Thamarassery  which  formed  the  Eastern  portion  of the  present Vadakara, Quilandy and Thamarassery Taluks.

Carnatic invasions into Wayanad and Gudalur
In 930 AD, emperor Erayappa of Ganga Dynasty led his troops to south west of Mysore and after conquering, called it Bayalnad meaning the land of swamps. After Erayappa, his sons Rachamalla and Battunga fought each other for the new kingdom of their father's legacy. Rachamalla was killed and Battunga became the undisputed ruler of Bayalnad. In the 12th century AD, Gangas were dethroned from Bayalnad by Kadamba dynasty of North Canara. In 1104 AD Vishnuvardhana of Hoysala invaded Bayalnad followed by Vijayanagara dynasty in the 16th century. In 1610 AD, Udaiyar Raja Wadiyar of Mysore drove out Vijayanagara General and became the ruler of Bayalnad and the Nilgiris. Bayalnad is the present Wayanad.

Mysore Sultans
When Wayanad was under Hyder Ali's rule, the ghat road from Vythiri to Thamarassery was invented. Then the British rulers developed this route to Carter road. After Hyder Ali, his son Tipu Sultan took control over the territory.

Colonial era
Kundah taluk was transferred from Malabar to Coimbatore in 1860. Southeast Wayanad region of Wayanad Taluk in Malabar District  was the regions included in the Gudalur and Pandalur Taluks of present Nilgiris district. Southeast Wynad was a part of Malabar District until 31 March 1877, when it was transferred to the neighbouring Nilgiris district due to the heavy population of Malabar and the small area of Nilgiris. It consisted of the following 3 Amsoms.

 Munnanad
 Nambalakode
 Cherankode

References

External links

 The Niligiris 

Cities and towns in Nilgiris district